DLU may refer to:

 IATA airport code for Dali Airport, China 
 ICAO airline code for Air Comet Chile